Cosy Cove is a settlement on Stoco Lake in the municipality of Tweed, Hastings County, Ontario, Canada, about  southwest of the community of Sulphide and  east of the village of Tweed. Sulphide Creek, a tributary of the Moira River, reaches its mouth at Stoco Lake in the community.

References

Communities in Hastings County